Sherman Greenfeld (born June 3, 1962) is a former Canadian professional racquetball player from Winnipeg, Manitoba. Greenfeld won two World Championships and 10 Canadian Championships, and was one of the top racquetball players in Canada during the 1980s and 1990s. Greenfeld retired from national competitions in 1999 following the Pan American Games in Winnipeg.

Early life
Greenfeld was born in Winnipeg into a Jewish family.

International career
Greenfeld won more international championships for Canada than any other player. He was the International Racquetball Federation World Champion in 1994 and 1998, and won the Pan American Racquetball Championships (then the Tournament of the Americas) three times, in 1990, 1994, and 1998.

Greenfeld was silver medalist at the 1999 Pan American Championships, his penultimate tournament for Canada, losing to fellow Canadian Mike Green in the final. Greenfeld also earned bronze medals in the 1995 Pan American Games and 1993 World Games.

Greenfeld's 18 appearances on Team Canada is tied for second most by a male player with Mike Ceresia. Greenfeld last played for Canada at the 1999 Pan American Games in his hometown of Winnipeg, where he finished fourth.

Canadian career
Greenfeld won the Canadian Championship in 1986–1988, 1990 & 1991, 1993–1996 and then finally in 1998. He also reached the finals in 1985, 1997 when he lost to Mike Ceresia and 1999 when he lost to Kane Waselenchuk.

Awards and honors
In 2001, Greenfeld was inducted into the Manitoba Sports Hall of Fame.

In 2000, Greenfeld was given the Ivan Velan Award, Racquetball Canada's highest honor.

In 2003, Racquetball Canada created the Sherman Greenfeld Award, which is presented annually at the Canadian Junior Racquetball Championships to a boy who exemplifies excellence on and off the court.

Halls of Fame

References

Canadian racquetball players
Jewish Canadian sportspeople
Living people
1962 births
Sportspeople from Winnipeg
Pan American Games bronze medalists for Canada
Pan American Games medalists in racquetball
World Games bronze medalists
Competitors at the 1993 World Games
Racquetball players at the 1995 Pan American Games
Racquetball players at the 1999 Pan American Games
Medalists at the 1995 Pan American Games